William mac an Iarla Burke was an Irish lord who was executed in 1580.

Under the year 1581, the Annals of the Four Masters relate the story of Burke:

The son of the Earl of Clanrickard, i.e. William Burke, son of Rickard Saxonagh, son of Ulick-na-gCeann, son of Rickard, son of Ulick of Cnoc-Tuagh, was hanged at Galway, the third day after the execution of Turlough O'Brien; that is, Turlough was hanged on Thursday, and William on Saturday. It happened that William was joined with his relatives in the war when they demolished their castles, as we have already mentioned; that he grew sorry for this, and went to Galway, under the protection of the English, the month before his execution; but some tale was fabricated against him, for which he was taken and hanged. Such of his followers as went in under this protection were also hanged.

Burke was hanged by William Óge Martyn (died 1592) who, aware that the Mayor of Galway, Dominick Lynch, had a pardon for Burke, prevented the Mayor from arriving in time to stop the execution of Burke and his men.

William Burke's elder brother, and one of the two chief leaders of the Mac an Iarla wars, became Earl of Clanricarde in 1582.

References

 History of Galway, James Hardiman, 1820
 Old Galway, Maureen Donovan O'Sullivan, 1942
 The Tribes of Galway, Adrian James Martyn, 2001
 Henry, William (2002). Role of Honour: The Mayors of Galway City 1485-2001. Galway: Galway City Council.  

Executed Irish people
16th-century Irish people
People from County Galway
1580 deaths
William Mac An Iarla
16th-century executions by Ireland
People executed by the Kingdom of Ireland by hanging
Younger sons of earls
Year of birth unknown